Polypoetes persimilis is a moth of the family Notodontidae. It is found in cloud forests on the eastern slope of the Andes in Colombia and Ecuador, at elevations between 2,000 and 3,200 meters.

References

Moths described in 1913
Notodontidae of South America